Conrad Paul Soares (22 April 1939 – 1 March 2012) was a Bermudian sailor who competed in the 1964 Summer Olympics.

References

1939 births
2012 deaths
Bermudian male sailors (sport)
Olympic sailors of Bermuda
Sailors at the 1964 Summer Olympics – Dragon